Fix Us is a 2019 Ghanaian movie produced by Yvonne Nelson and directed by Pascal Amanfo. The film won several awards at the Ghana Movie Awards.

Plot
Three young woman who had  ambitions of becoming superstars meet at an audition ground where they had similar dreams, they became friends and later on in life had their dreams come through but they felt that something was missing in their lives after achieving fame and wealth.

Cast 

 Yvonne Nelson
 Yvonne Okoro
 Alexandra Amon
 Prince David Osei
 Michelle Attoh
 Jessica Williams
 Belinda Dzattah
 Mona Montrage (Hajia4Reall), 
 Irene Logan
 Mofe Duncan 
 Tobi Bakre

Production 
Several African actors were announced as starring in the film, which included Yvonne Okoro, Prince David Osei, and Michelle Attoh. The film marked the acting debut for social media influencer Hajia4Reall and musician Irene Logan.

Release 
Fix Us premiered in Ghana on 6 December 2019 at the Silverbird Theaters in Accra, after which it screened in Ghana as well as in other areas of Africa. In 2020 the movie premiered on Netflix.

Reception 
Pulse Nigeria listed Fix Us as one of the best new Ghanaian films of the year, with both the outlet and Glitz Africa magazine noting that it had received a positive reception upon release. Kemi Filani News was critical of the movie, stating that it contained "bad acting, shabby story-telling, poor continuity, over dwelling on one scene and lots more annoying issues."

Awards 

 Ghana Movie Award for Performance as an Actress in a Supporting Role (won, Michelle Atton)
 Ghana Movie Award for Sound Editing and Mixing (won, Bernie Anti)
 Ghana Movie Award for Cinematography (won, John Passah)
 Ghana Movie Award for Music Original Score (won, Berni Anti)
 Ghana Movie Award for Writing Adapted or Original Screenplay (won, Pascal Amanfo)

References

External links 
 
 

2019 films
Ghanaian drama films
2010s English-language films
English-language Ghanaian films